San Luis is a town, with a population of 5,857 (2013 census), and a municipality in the Honduran department of Santa Bárbara.

San Luis Municipality has a population of about 25,500. Its economy is based strongly around coffee farming. San Luis is in a region with many pine-covered hills.

Demographics
At the time of the 2013 Honduras census, San Luis municipality had a population of 24,606. Of these, 79.30% were Mestizo, 19.91% White, 0.43% Black or Afro-Honduran, 0.34% Indigenous and 0.02% others.

References

External links
 San Luis Region map

Municipalities of the Santa Bárbara Department, Honduras